Carolyn Mae Welch (September 11, 1922 - May 7, 2020) was an American figure skater.  She competed in pairs and won the bronze medals at the 1947 U.S. Figure Skating Championships with partner Charles Brinkman.

Results
(Pairs with Brinkman)

References

1922 births
2020 deaths
American female pair skaters
21st-century American women
20th-century American women